Chino Valley is a town in Yavapai County, Arizona, United States. According to the 2010 census, the population of the town is 10,817.

Geography
Chino Valley is located at  (34.758381, -112.449758). The smaller north-trending Little Chino Valley lies just east of the townsite.

History
Chino Valley is the site of the first Territorial Capital of Arizona. U.S. Army Cavalry Lt. Amiel W. Whipple, while traveling through the area in 1854, gave the community its name. "Chino" is the Spanish name for the abundant curly grama grass growing in the area.

In 1895, a narrow gauge branch of the United Verde and Pacific Railroad to Jerome, joining the Santa Fe, Prescott, and Phoenix Railway, was completed, and Jerome Junction was established. In 1923, the activities of Jerome Junction were absorbed by Chino Valley.

In 1960, Chino Valley's population was estimated as 50 residents. 

The town of Chino Valley was incorporated in 1970.

Demographics

As of the census of 2000, there were 7,835 people, 3,030 households, and 2,172 families residing in the town. The racial makeup of the town was 94.1% White, 0.2% Black or African American, 0.9% Native American, 0.2% Asian, 0.1% Pacific Islander, 2.6% from other races, and 1.9% from two or more races. 9.8% of the population were Hispanic or Latino of any race.

There were 3,030 households, out of which 32.5% had children under the age of 18 living with them, 57.3% were married couples living together, 10.3% had a female householder with no husband present, and 28.3% were non-families. 23.0% of all households were made up of individuals, and 11.1% had someone living alone who was 65 years of age or older. The average household size was 2.58 and the average family size was 3.01.

In the town, the population was spread out, with 26.5% under the age of 18, 7.1% from 18 to 24, 25.0% from 25 to 44, 25.1% from 45 to 64, and 16.2% who were 65 years of age or older. The median age was 40 years. For every 100 females, there were 96.4 males. For every 100 females age 18 and over, there were 91.5 males.

The median income for a household in the town was $32,289, and the median income for a family was $35,013. Males had a median income of $27,160 versus $21,667 for females. The per capita income for the town was $15,555. About 12.6% of families and 15.5% of the population were below the poverty line, including 20.2% of those under age 18 and 13.5% of those age 65 or over.

Climate

Education

The Chino Valley Unified School District presently operates four school facilities in the Town of Chino Valley. Territorial Early Education Center (Pre-K through Second Grade) and Del Rio Elementary (Third through Fifth Grades) students.

Heritage Middle School educates sixth through eighth graders in the district. Two County Teachers of the Year and Two Channel 3 Silver Apple Teacher award winners are on the HMS faculty.

Chino Valley High School partners with Yavapai College Campus for Agribusiness, Science & Technology, located in Chino Valley, where seniors may jointly enroll in CVHS and Yavapai for advanced study. The school's Aquaculture & Biotech Lab, Greenhouse and Livestock Facilities support the FFA program. CVHS houses five computer lab environments for students plus programs in music and art, and an FBLA program, along with the full component of extracurricular activities and sports programs.

The district operates under the supervision of a five-member governing board and one district superintendent. The district presently employs 7 administrators and 6 directors on a full-time basis, 158 certified teachers and 190 full- and part-time classified employees.

Chino Valley has two charter schools that operate in the town. Mingus Springs is a kindergarten–8th grade school that services over 180 students. Excel Education Centers is a 6th–12th grade school that services over 50 students.

Chino Valley also has a campus of Yavapai College.

Government

Gallery

Del Rio Springs
A private cemetery in Del Rio Springs holds early settlers. There is a historical marker in Chino Valley which has the following inscription:

References

External links
 Chino Valley, AZ
 Chino Valley, Arizona Detailed Profile
 Chino Valley Unified School District
 Chino Valley Chamber of Commerce
 Chino Valley Review
 Prescott eNews – Original Local News Website
 Chino Valley Historical Society

Towns in Yavapai County, Arizona
Populated places established in 1970